Ronald William Latham (31 July 1913 – 12 August 1975) was an Australian rules footballer who played with Fitzroy in the Victorian Football League (VFL).

Notes

External links 

1913 births
1975 deaths
Australian rules footballers from Victoria (Australia)
Fitzroy Football Club players